Morristown Medical Center (MMC) is a 735 bed non-profit, tertiary, research and academic medical center located in Morristown, New Jersey, serving northern New Jersey and the New York metropolitan area. The hospital is the flagship facility of Atlantic Health System and is the largest medical center in the system.  Morristown Medical Center is affiliated with the Sidney Kimmel School of Medicine at Thomas Jefferson University. 

The facility is an American College of Surgeons designated Level I and Level 2 trauma center by the State of New Jersey and has a rooftop helipad to receive and dispatch medevac patients. 

Goryeb Children's Hospital is located on the campus of Morristown Medical Center and specializes in the treatment of infants, children, adolescents, and young adults up to the age of 21.

Morristown Medical Center was established in 1892. With approximately 7,000 employees, it is Morristown's largest employer and one of the largest employers in Morris County, New Jersey.

History 
In 1889, Myra Brookfield bequeathed her home and property for the purpose of establishing a hospital. She stipulated that the community-at-large raise $15,000 to buy equipment and hire staff within three years of her death. In 1893, the house was too small for the hospital, so it was sold and the profits were put toward the purchase of a bigger facility – a former parsonage in downtown Morristown, used as a makeshift hospital by George Washington more than 100 years earlier.

Morristown Memorial Hospital opened its doors on October 17, 1893. 
Early on, the hospital established an isolation unit for patients with contagious diseases. As large-scale epidemics were a fact of life in 19th-century America, that ward helped to slow or prevent the spread of dangerous diseases in the community. In 1898 a new building for the hospital was donated by George Goelet Kip, named the Anna Margaret Home for Convalescents in honor of his late wife. By the turn of the century, Morristown Memorial had an operating room, X-ray equipment, a pathology lab and an outpatient clinic.

The hospital hired Jennie A. Dean, its first female doctor, to run the pathology lab in 1913, a full seven years before American women had the right to vote. Her sister, Elvira Dean, was hired to run the X-ray department.
 1921 – The Outpatient Department opened its doors, a precursor to today's Emergency Department (although the hospital didn't replace its horse-drawn ambulance with a motorized one until 1924).
 1938 – The hospital established a tumor section to study and treat cancer; that same year, radium therapy was introduced.
 1952 – Morristown Memorial moved into a new facility on Madison Avenue. In the 1960s, the hospital doubled in size.
 1996 – Overlook and Morristown Memorial hospitals joined forces as Atlantic Health.
 2002 – Goryeb Children's Hospital opened adjacent to the Morristown Memorial Hospital campus.
 2008 – Gagnon Cardiovascular Institute opened.
 2009 – Morristown Memorial Hospital changed its name to Morristown Medical Center, part of Atlantic Health System.
In a ruling issued in June 2015, Tax Court Judge Vito Bianco ruled that the hospital would be required to pay property taxes on nearly all of its  campus.

Statistics 
As of 2021, Morristown Medical Center includes:

 Employees: 6,483
 Physicians/Providers: 1,863
 Medical Residents: 219
 Licensed Beds: 735
 Admissions: 42,814
 Births: 4,954
 Emergency Visits: 93,362
 Outpatient Visits: 811,251

Specialties 
Morristown Medical Center is verified as a Level I Regional Trauma Center by the American College of Surgeons, designated a Level II by the state of New Jersey and a Level III Regional Perinatal Center.

Specialty areas include:

 Cardiology and Heart Surgery
 Adult and Pediatric Oncology
 Orthopedics
 Critical and Emergency Care
 Gynecology
 Geriatrics
 Gastroenterology and GI Surgery
 Pulmonology and Lung Surgery
 Urology
 Inpatient Rehabilitation
 Neonatal Intensive Care
 Neuroscience
 Maternity and Women’s Health

Affiliations and Accreditations 
Morristown Medical Center is the official hospital of the New York Jets football team. The Atlantic Health Jets Training Center in Florham Park, NJ, is the corporate headquarters for the team franchise. The campus includes a 120,000 square foot structure to house indoor training facilities and classrooms; and an 86,000 square foot field house where Jets players practice on a full-size, indoor, artificial-turf field.

Morristown Medical Center is affiliated with the Sidney Kimmel School of Medicine at Thomas Jefferson University.

Morristown Medical Center is a Magnet Hospital for Excellence in Nursing Service, the highest level of recognition achievable from the American Nurses Credentialing Center for facilities that provide acute care services.

Awards and Accolades 

 Morristown Medical Center has been rated the number one hospital in New Jersey by U.S. News & World Report for four years in a row.
 U.S. News & World Report recognized Morristown Medical Center as a national leader in cardiology and heart surgery (#42), orthopedics (#30), gynecology (#28), geriatrics, gastroenterology and GI surgery, pulmonology and lung surgery, and urology.
 Morristown Medical Center is the only hospital in New Jersey named one of America’s “50 Best Hospitals” for seven consecutive years by Healthgrades.
 Newsweek named Morristown Medical Center as one of the World’s Best Hospitals (the 46th best hospital in the United States and number one in NJ), Best Hospital for Infection Prevention and one of the World’s Best Smart Hospitals.  
 Morristown Medical Center was included on Becker's Healthcare 2020 list of "100 Great Hospitals in America.”
 Leapfrog recognized Morristown Medical Center with an “A” hospital safety grade, its highest, thirteen consecutive times, and the Centers for Medicare and Medicaid Services award with its highest five-star rating in 2020.
 Morristown Medical Center named to Fortune and IBM Watson Health 100 Top Hospitals® list in 2021.
 Morristown Medical Center recognized as a “Leader in LGBTQ Healthcare Equality” since 2013 by the Human Rights Campaign (HRC) Foundation.
 In 2020 the hospital received 8 Women's Choice Awards ranked as top 2% in bariatrics, top 6% in patient safety, top 1% in obstetrics, top 1% in heart care, top 2% in cancer care, top 8% in breast care, top 4% in stroke care, and best patient experience.

Goryeb Children's Hospital 

Goryeb Children's Hospital is a children's hospital located on the campus of Morristown Medical Center and provides pediatric care from infancy to age 21. The hospital has a wide range of pediatric specialties and subspecialties. In 2019, an expanded Pediatric Intensive Care Unit with 15 beds opened to increase the number of pediatric critical cases the hospital could handle. 

The hospital also houses a 34-bed Level III Neonatal Intensive Care Unit dedicated to the care of newborns. The PICU and the NICU are directly attached to several Ronald McDonald House sleeping rooms for parents and siblings.

Services 
Pediatric services offered at Goryeb Children's Hospital include:

 Adolescent Medicine
 Emergency Medicine
 General Pediatrics, Neonatology
 Allergies & Immunology
 Behavioral Health
 Brain Tumors
 Cardiology
 Craniofacial Services
 Critical Care
 Diabetes and Endocrinology
 Gastroenterology and Nutrition
 Genetics
 Hematology and Oncology
 Infectious Diseases
 Nephrology
 Neurology and Neurosurgery
 Orthopedics
 Palliative Care
 Physiatry
 Physical Rehabilitation
 Pulmonology
 Rheumatology
 Surgery
 Urology

Awards 
In 2020, Goryeb Children's Hospital received two awards from the Women's Choice Awards hospital rankings; Best Children's Hospital and Best Pediatric Emergency Care.

Notable deaths
The following list is arranged chronologically, based on date of death:
Frederick T. van Beuren Jr. (1876–1943)
Lyman Pierson Powell (1866–1946)
Elias Bertram Mott (1879–1961) 
George Washington Jr. (1899–1966)
Edward Francis Cavanagh Jr. (1906–1986)
Anne Homer Doerflinger (1907–1995)

References

External links
Official website

Hospitals in New Jersey
Morristown, New Jersey
Hospitals established in 1889
Buildings and structures in Morris County, New Jersey
Companies based in Morris County, New Jersey
Trauma centers